Hennessey is an Irish surname, being the anglicised form of Ó hAonghusa. Families of this name were found in Kingdom of Uí Failghe and Kingdom of Desmond. Notable people with the surname include:

Brad Hennessey (born 1980), baseball player
Charlotte Hennessey (1873–1928), Canadian actress; mother of Mary Pickford (Gladys Louise Smith), Lottie Pickford and Jack Pickford
Dan Hennessey (born 1941), Canadian voice actor
Dorothy Hennessey (1913–2008), Roman Catholic religious sister and activist
Gwen Hennessey (born 1932), Roman Catholic religious sister and activist
Keith Hennessey, director of the U.S. National Economic Council
Terry Hennessey (born 1942), Welsh footballer
Wayne Hennessey (born 1987), Welsh footballer
John Hennessey, founder of Hennessey Performance Engineering

Fictional characters:
Alistair Hennessey, fictional rival to the eponymous character of The Life Aquatic with Steve Zissou

See also
Hennessy (surname)

Surnames of Irish origin
Anglicised Irish-language surnames